Rebecca Nelson may refer to:

Rebecca J. Nelson, educator
Rebecca Nelson, character, in A, B, C... Manhattan